The Battle of Bloody Run was fought during Pontiac's War on July 31, 1763, on what now is the site of Elmwood Cemetery in the Eastside Historic Cemetery District of Detroit, Michigan. In an attempt to break Pontiac's siege of Fort Detroit, about 250 British troops attempted to make a surprise attack on Pontiac's encampment.

However, he did not accomplish the destruction of this British force which would have greatly demoralized the British and dissuaded more British efforts to break the Indian siege of Fort Detroit. The creek, or run, was said to have run red with the blood of the 20 dead and 41 wounded British forces and was henceforth known as Bloody Run. The British forces retreated with all their wounded and all but seven of those killed. The attack's commander, Captain James Dalyell, was one of those killed. After learning of Dalyell's death, General Jeffery Amherst offered a £200 bounty to anyone who would kill Pontiac.

The famous frontiersman Robert Rogers was one of the British commanders in this battle.

See also
 List of battles won by Indigenous peoples of the Americas
 Council Point Park

References

External links
 Michigan Historical Marker: Battle of Bloody Run

1763 in the British Empire
1763 in New France
Bloody Run
Conflicts in 1763
History of Detroit
Battles in Michigan